Rodner Figueroa  (born 1972) is a Venezuelan television show host. Figueroa has hosted shows on Univision, such as El Gordo y La Flaca, Sal y Pimienta, and for Al Rojo Vivo on the Telemundo network.

Career

Univision
Early 2015 during a segment on the work of makeup artist Paolo Ballesteros, Figueroa stated multiple times in Spanish that Michelle Obama "looks like a character from the movie Planet of the Apes." His co-hosts contested, but Figueroa made the statement again. Figueroa was subsequently fired by Univision for the racist comment. After losing his job, Figueroa later publicly apologized about the comments.

Telemundo
In October 2017, Figueroa joined María Celeste Arrarás on the Telemundo network news program Al Rojo Vivo.

Personal
Figueroa and the man who replaced him as host of Sal y Pimienta, Mexican show host Carlos Calderon, are personal friends. Figueroa stated he is happy that Calderon replaced him. Rodner Figueroa is in a relationship with Ernesto Mathies and publicly acknowledged his homosexuality.

References

External links

1967 births
Venezuelan LGBT entertainers
Venezuelan gay men
Living people
Univision people
Venezuelan television personalities